Yelena Pavlova (born December 12, 1978) is a retired volleyball player from Kazakhstan, born in Tashkent, who captained the Women's National Team at the 2008 Olympic Qualification Tournament in Japan. There the team ended up in fifth place, and qualified for the 2008 Summer Olympics. Pavlova became "Best Scorer" at the event, alongside Puerto Rico's Karina Ocasio. In 2012-2013 she played with VC Zhetysu.

Clubs
  Rahat CSKA (2007)

Awards

Individuals
 2007 Asian Club Championship "Most Valuable Player"
 2007 Asian Club Championship "Best Spiker"
 2008 Olympic Qualifier "Best Scorer"

Clubs
 2007 Asian Club Championship -  Champion, with Rahat CSKA

References

 Profile

1978 births
Living people
Sportspeople from Tashkent
Kazakhstani women's volleyball players
Volleyball players at the 2002 Asian Games
Volleyball players at the 2006 Asian Games
Volleyball players at the 2008 Summer Olympics
Olympic volleyball players of Kazakhstan
Asian Games competitors for Kazakhstan
Kazakhstani expatriate sportspeople in Spain
Expatriate volleyball players in Spain
21st-century Kazakhstani women